More Light Presbyterians is a coalition of congregations and individuals in the Presbyterian Church (USA) committed to increasing the involvement of all people in the church, regardless of sexuality.

History
The informal beginning of the More Light movement was in 1974, when David Bailey Sindt, at a meeting of the Presbyterian General Assembly, held up a sign reading "Is anybody else out there gay?" 

Sindt invited sympathetic individuals within the church to join what he first called the "Presbyterian Gay Caucus," later changing the name to "Presbyterians for Gay Concerns," and then "Presbyterians for Lesbian and Gay Concerns (PLGC)." At that time all national Presbyterian organizations were required to submit an annual report to the General Assembly, and the PLGC was invited to do so by William P. Thompson, Stated Clerk of the assembly. However, after two hours of debate, the assembly refused to accept the group's report. Subsequently, reports from the group were written, submitted, and rejected every year until 1979.

It was after the 190th meeting of the General Assembly in 1978, when the assembly approved a statement that "homosexuality is not God's wish for humanity" and "unrepentant homosexual practice does not accord with the requirements for ordination" that several Presbyterian congregations  adopted policies welcoming lesbian and gay members and affirming their right to ordination as deacon and elder if elected by the congregation and found qualified by the session.

Although there were other Presbyterian congregations which had been actively welcoming lesbian and gay members (notably the Munn Avenue Presbyterian Church and the West Hollywood Presbyterian Church in Los Angeles), the first congregation to make a formal statement from the pulpit declaring itself a More Light Church was West Park Presbyterian Church in Manhattan in 1978. 

At that time, Rev. Robert Davidson, pastor of West Park made the following statement from the pulpit:

The More Light Churches Network (MLCN) was formalized in 1992, and in June 1998 the group combined with the former Presbyterians for Gay and Lesbian Concerns to make a single organization, More Light Presbyterians.

More Light is one of several American Christian LGBT-welcoming church programs working for gay inclusion in America. Similar groups in other denominations are "Reconciling Congregations" among the Methodists, "Open and Affirming Congregations" in the United Church of Christ and Christian Church (Disciples of Christ), "Association of Welcoming and Affirming Baptists" in the Baptist church, "Reconciled in Christ Congregations" among the Evangelical Lutherans and Integrity USA in the Episcopal Church.

Origin of the name "More Light"
John Robinson, spiritual leader of the pilgrims who founded the Plymouth Colony, died in England before he could join his followers in the New World. In 1646, governor Edward Winslow recalled Robinson's farewell to the pilgrims as they set sail on the Mayflower. Robinson had urged the pilgrims to be open to new religious teaching, and:

...if God should reveal anything to us by any other instrument of his, to be as ready to receive it, as ever we were to receive any truth by his Ministry. For he was very confident the Lord had more truth and light yet to break forth out of his holy Word.

No teacher yet had perfect knowledge of God, Robinson had said:

"For though they were precious shining lights in their Times, yet God had not revealed his whole will to them; and were they now living," saith he, "they would be as ready and willing to embrace further light as that they had received."

In the 1850s the Congregationalist hymnwriter George Rawson (1807-1889) used Robinson's speech as the basis of his hymn "We Limit Not the Truth of God," with the lyric:

We limit not the truth of God to our poor reach of mind --
By notions of our day and sect -- crude, partial, and confined

That universe, how much unknown! that ocean unexplored
For God hath yet more light and truth to break forth from the Word.

Eternal God, Incarnate Word, Spirit of flame and dove,
enlarge, expand all living souls to comprehend your love;

and help us all to seek your will with wiser powers conferred
O God, grant yet more light and truth to break forth from the Word.''

See also

LGBT-welcoming church programs

References

External links
 More Light Presbyterians
 Profile of David Bailey Sindt
 The Lesbian and Gay Liberation Movement in the Churches of the United States, 1969-1993, by James D. Anderson

LGBT Christian organizations
Presbyterian organizations
Presbyterianism